F.C. Excelsior is a football club that plays in the Segunda División Profesional. The club is based in Monterrey, Nuevo León, Mexico.

Current roster
As of June 14, 2010

See also
Football in Mexico

External links
Segunda Division

Football clubs in Monterrey
Association football clubs established in 2008
2008 establishments in Mexico